BeOS is an operating system for personal computers first developed by Be Inc. in 1990. It was first written to run on BeBox hardware.
 
BeOS was positioned as a multimedia platform that could be used by a substantial population of desktop users and a competitor to Classic Mac OS and Microsoft Windows. It was ultimately unable to achieve a significant market share, and did not prove commercially viable for Be Inc. The company was acquired by Palm Inc. Today BeOS is mainly used, and derivatives developed, by a small population of enthusiasts.

The open-source operating system Haiku is a continuation of BeOS concepts and most of the application level compatibility. The latest version, Beta 4 released December 2022, still retains BeOS 5 compatibility in its x86 32-bit images.

History 

Initially designed to run on AT&T Hobbit-based hardware, BeOS was later modified to run on PowerPC-based processors: first Be's own systems, later Apple Computer's PowerPC Reference Platform and Common Hardware Reference Platform, with the hope that Apple would purchase or license BeOS as a replacement for its aging Classic Mac OS. 

Toward the end of 1996, Apple was still looking for a replacement to Copland in their operating system strategy. Amidst rumours of Apple's interest in purchasing BeOS, Be wanted to increase their user base, to try to convince software developers to write software for the operating system. Be courted Macintosh clone vendors to ship BeOS with their hardware.

Apple CEO Gil Amelio started negotiations to buy Be Inc., but negotiations stalled when Be CEO Jean-Louis Gassée wanted $300 million; Apple was unwilling to offer any more than $125 million. Apple's board of directors decided NeXTSTEP was a better choice and purchased NeXT in 1996 for $429 million, bringing back Apple co-founder Steve Jobs.

In 1997, Power Computing began bundling BeOS (on a CD for optional installation) with its line of PowerPC-based Macintosh clones. These systems could dual boot either the Classic Mac OS or BeOS, with a start-up screen offering the choice. Motorola also announced in February 1997 that it would bundle BeOS with their Macintosh clones, the Motorola StarMax, along with MacOS.

Due to Apple's moves and the mounting debt of Be Inc., BeOS was soon ported to the Intel x86 platform with its R3 release in March 1998. Through the late 1990s, BeOS managed to create a niche of followers, but the company failed to remain viable.  Be Inc. also released a stripped-down, but free, copy of BeOS R5 known as BeOS Personal Edition (BeOS PE). BeOS PE could be started from within Microsoft Windows or Linux, and was intended to nurture consumer interest in its product and give developers something to tinker with. Be Inc. also released a stripped-down version of BeOS for Internet Appliances (BeIA), which soon became the company's business focus in place of BeOS.

In 2001 Be's copyrights were sold to Palm, Inc. for some $11 million. BeOS R5 is considered the last official version, but BeOS R5.1 "Dano", which was under development before Be's sale to Palm and included the BeOS Networking Environment (BONE) networking stack, was leaked to the public shortly after the company's demise.

In 2002, Be Inc. sued Microsoft claiming that Hitachi had been dissuaded from selling PCs loaded with BeOS, and that Compaq had been pressured not to market an Internet appliance in partnership with Be. Be also claimed that Microsoft acted to artificially depress Be Inc.'s initial public offering (IPO). The case was eventually settled out of court for $23.25 million with no admission of liability on Microsoft's part.

After the split from Palm, PalmSource used parts of BeOS's multimedia framework for its failed Palm OS Cobalt product. With the takeover of PalmSource, the BeOS rights now belong to Access Co.

Continuation and clones 

In the years that followed the demise of Be Inc. a handful of projects formed to recreate BeOS or key elements of the OS with the eventual goal of then continuing where Be Inc. left off. This was facilitated by Be Inc. having released some components of BeOS under a free licence. Such projects include:

 BlueEyedOS: It uses a modified version of the Linux kernel and reimplements the BeOS API over it (BeOS applications need to be recompiled).  It is freely downloadable, but sources were never published.  There have been no releases since 2003.
 Cosmoe: A port of the Haiku userland over a Linux kernel. BeOS applications need to be recompiled.  It is free and open source software.  The last release was in 2004 and its website is no longer online.
 E/OS: short for Emulator Operating System.  A Linux and FreeBSD-based operating system that aimed to run Windows, DOS, AmigaOS and BeOS applications.  It is free and open source software. Active development ended in July 2008.
 Haiku: A complete reimplementation of BeOS not based on Linux. Unlike Cosmoe and BlueEyedOS, it is directly compatible with BeOS applications.  It is open source software. As of 2022, it was the only BeOS clone still under development, with the fourth beta (December 2022) still keeping BeOS 5 compatibility in its x86 32-bit images, with an increased number of modern drivers and GTK apps ported.

Zeta was a commercially available operating system based on the BeOS R5.1 codebase. Originally developed by yellowTAB, the operating system was then distributed by magnussoft. During development by yellowTAB, the company received criticism from the BeOS community for refusing to discuss its legal position with regard to the BeOS codebase (perhaps for contractual reasons). Access Co. (which bought PalmSource, until then the holder of the intellectual property associated with BeOS) has since declared that yellowTAB had no right to distribute a modified version of BeOS, and magnussoft has ceased distribution of the operating system.

Version history

Features 

BeOS was built for digital media work and was written to take advantage of modern hardware facilities such as symmetric multiprocessing by utilizing modular I/O bandwidth, pervasive multithreading, preemptive multitasking and a 64-bit journaling file system known as BFS. The BeOS GUI was developed on the principles of clarity and a clean, uncluttered design.

The API was written in C++ for ease of programming. The GUI was largely multithreaded: each window ran in its own thread, relying heavily on sending messages to communicate between threads; and these concepts are reflected into the API.

It has partial POSIX compatibility and access to a command-line interface through Bash, although internally it is not a Unix-derived operating system. Many Unix applications were ported to the BeOS command-line interface.

BeOS used Unicode as the default encoding in the GUI, though support for input methods such as bidirectional text input was never realized.

Products using BeOS 
BeOS (and now Zeta) continue to be used in media appliances, such as the Edirol DV-7 video editors from Roland Corporation, which run on top of a modified BeOS and the Tunetracker Radio Automation software that used to run it on BeOS and Zeta, and it was also sold as a "Station-in-a-Box" with the Zeta operating system included. In 2015, Tunetracker released a Haiku distribution bundled with its broadcasting software.

The Tascam SX-1 digital audio recorder runs a heavily modified version of BeOS that will only launch the recording interface software.

The RADAR 24, RADAR V and RADAR 6, hard disk-based, 24-track professional audio recorders from iZ Technology Corporation were based on BeOS 5.

Magicbox, a manufacturer of signage and broadcast display machines, uses BeOS to power their Aavelin product line.

Final Scratch, a 12-inch vinyl timecode record-driven DJ software/hardware system, was first developed on BeOS. The "ProFS" version was sold to a few dozen DJs prior to the 1.0 release, which ran on a Linux virtual partition.

See also 

 Haiku (operating system)
 Access Co.
 BeIA
 bootman
 Comparison of operating systems
 Gobe Productive
 Hitachi Flora Prius
 KDL
 NetPositive
 OpenTracker
 Pe

References

Further reading

External links 
 The Dawn of Haiku, by Ryan Leavengood, IEEE Spectrum May 2012, p 40–43,51-54.
 Mirror of the old www.be.com site Other Mirror of the old www.be.com site
 BeOS Celebrating Ten Years
 BeGroovy A blog dedicated to all things BeOS 
 BeOS: The Mac OS X might-have-been, reghardware.co.uk
 Programming the Be Operating System: An O'Reilly Open Book (out of print, but can be downloaded)
 
  (BeOS)

 
Discontinued operating systems
Object-oriented operating systems
PowerPC operating systems
X86 operating systems